Johannes Huber (10 December 1929 — 28 January 2014) was a German ice hockey player. He competed in the men's tournaments at the 1956 Winter Olympics and the 1960 Winter Olympics.

References

External links
 

1929 births
2014 deaths
Ice hockey players at the 1956 Winter Olympics
Ice hockey players at the 1960 Winter Olympics
Olympic ice hockey players of Germany
Olympic ice hockey players of the United Team of Germany
People from Rosenheim
Sportspeople from Upper Bavaria